Films made in the 1970s featuring the character of James Bond included Diamonds Are Forever, Live and Let Die, The Man with the Golden Gun, The Spy Who Loved Me, and Moonraker.

Diamonds Are Forever
Filming began on 5 April 1971, with the South African scenes actually shot in the desert near Las Vegas, and finished on 13 August 1971. The film was shot primarily in the US, with locations including the Los Angeles International Airport, Universal City Studios and eight hotels of Las Vegas. Besides the Pinewood Studios in Buckinghamshire, other places in England were Dover and Southampton. The climactic oil rig sequence was shot off the shore of Oceanside, California. Other filming locations included Cap D'Antibes in France for the opening scenes, Amsterdam and Lufthansa's hangar in Germany.

Filming in Las Vegas took place mostly in hotels owned by Howard Hughes, since he was a friend of Cubby Broccoli. Getting the streets empty in order to shoot was achieved through the collaboration of Hughes, the Las Vegas police and shopkeepers association. The Las Vegas Hilton doubled for the Whyte House, and since the owner of the Circus Circus was a Bond fan, he allowed the Circus to be used on film and even made a cameo. The cinematographers said filming in Las Vegas at night had an advantage: no additional illumination was required due to the high number of neon lights. Sean Connery made the most of his time on location in Las Vegas. "I didn't get any sleep at all. We shot every night, I caught all the shows and played golf all day. On the weekend I collapsed – boy, did I collapse. Like a skull with legs." He also played the slot machines, and once delayed a scene because he was collecting his winnings.

The site used for the Willard Whyte Space Labs (where Bond gets away in the Moon Buggy) was actually, at that time, a Johns-Manville gypsum plant located just outside Las Vegas. The home of Kirk Douglas was used for the scene in Tiffany's house, while the Elrod House in Palm Springs, designed by John Lautner, became Willard Whyte's house. The exterior shots of the Slumber mortuary were of a real crematorium on the outskirts of Las Vegas. The interiors were a set constructed at Pinewood Studios, where Ken Adam imitated the real building's lozenge-shaped stained glass window in its nave. During location filming, Adam visited several funeral homes in the Las Vegas area, the inspiration behind the gaudy design of the Slumber mortuary (the use of tasteless Art Deco furniture and Tiffany lamps) came from these experiences. Production wrapped with the crematorium sequence, on 13 August 1971.

Since the car chase in Las Vegas would have many car crashes, the filmmakers had an arrangement with Ford to use their vehicles. Ford's only demand was that Sean Connery had to drive the 1971 Mustang Mach 1 which serves as Tiffany Case's car. The Moon Buggy was inspired by the actual NASA vehicle, but with additions such as flaying arms since the producers didn't find the design "outrageous" enough. Built by custom car fabricator Dean Jeffries on a rear-engined Corvair chassis, it was capable of road speeds. The fibreglass  tires had to be replaced during the chase sequence because the heat and irregular desert soil ruined them.

Hamilton had the idea of making a fight scene inside a lift, which was choreographed and done by Sean Connery and stuntman Joe Robinson. The car chase where the red Mustang comes outside of the narrow street on the opposite side in which it was rolled, was filmed over three nights on Fremont Street in Las Vegas. The alleyway car roll sequence is actually filmed in two locations. The entrance was at the car park at Universal Studios and the exit was at Fremont Street, Las Vegas. It eventually inspired a continuity mistake, as the car enters the alley on the right side tires and exits the street driving on the left side. While filming the scene of finding Plenty O´Toole drowned in Tiffany's swimming pool, Lana Wood actually had her feet loosely tied to a cement block on the bottom. Film crew members held a rope across the pool for her, with which she could lift her face out of the water to breathe between takes. The pool's sloping bottom made the block slip into deeper water with each take. Eventually, Wood was submerged but was noticed by on-lookers and rescued before drowning for real. Wood, being a certified diver, took some water but remained calm during the ordeal, although she later admitted to a few "very uncomfortable moments and quite some struggling until they pulled me out."

Live and Let Die
Principal photography began in October 1972, in Louisiana.
For a while only the second unit was shot after Moore was diagnosed with kidney stones. In November production moved to Jamaica, which doubled for the fictional San Monique. In December, production was divided between interiors in Pinewood Studios and location shooting in Harlem. The producers were reportedly required to pay protection money to a local Harlem gang to ensure the crew's safety. When the cash ran out, they were "encouraged" to leave.

Ross Kananga suggested the jump on crocodiles, and was enlisted by the producers to do the stunt. The scene took five takes to be completed, including one in which the last crocodile snapped at Kananga's heel, tearing his trousers. The production also had trouble with snakes. The script supervisor was so afraid that she refused to be on set with them; an actor fainted while filming a scene where he is killed by a snake; Jane Seymour became terrified as a reptile got closer, and Geoffrey Holder only agreed to fall into the snake-filled casket because Princess Alexandra was visiting the set.

The boat chase was filmed on the Louisiana bayou, with some interruption caused by flooding. Twenty-six boats were built by the Glastron boat company for the film. Seventeen were destroyed during rehearsals. The speedboat jump scene over the bayou, filmed with the assistance of a specially-constructed ramp, unintentionally set a Guinness World Record at the time with  cleared. Unfortunately, the waves created by the impact caused the following boat to flip over.

The chase involving the double-decker bus was filmed with a second-hand London bus adapted by having a top section removed, and then placed back in situ running on ball bearings to allow to slide off on impact. The stunts involving the bus were performed by Maurice Patchett, a London Transport bus driving instructor.

The Man with the Golden Gun

On 6 November 1973 filming commenced at the part-submerged wreck of the RMS Queen Elizabeth, which acted as a top-secret MI6 base grounded in Victoria Harbour in Hong Kong. The crew was small, and a stunt double was used for James Bond. The major part of principal photography started in April 1974 in Thailand. Thai locations included Bangkok, Thon Buri, Phuket and the nearby Phang Nga Province, on the islands of Ko Khao Phing Kan and Ko Tapu. Scaramanga's hideout is on Ko Khao Phing Kan, and Ko Tapu is often now referred to as James Bond Island both by locals and in tourist guidebooks. The scene during the boxing match used an actual Muay Thai fixture at the Lumpinee Boxing Stadium. In late April, production returned to Hong Kong, and also shot in Macau, as the island is famous for its casinos, which Hong Kong does not have.

As some scenes in Thailand had to be finished, and also production had to move to studio work in Pinewood Studios—which included sets such as Scaramanga's solar energy plant and island interior—cinematographer Ted Moore became ill and Academy Award winner Oswald Morris was hired to finish the job. Morris was initially reluctant, as he did not like his previous experiences taking over other cinematographers' work, but accepted after dining with Broccoli. Production wrapped in Pinewood in August 1974.

One of the main stunts in the film consisted of stunt driver "Bumps" Willard (as James Bond) driving an AMC Hornet leaping a broken bridge and spinning around 360 degrees in mid-air about the longitudinal axis, doing an "aerial twist"; Willard successfully completed the jump on the first take. The stunt was shown in slow motion as the scene was too fast. Composer John Barry added a slide whistle sound effect over the stunt, which Broccoli kept in despite thinking that it "undercouped the stunt". Barry later regretted his decision, thinking the whistle "broke the golden rule" as the stunt was "for what it was all worth, a truly dangerous moment, ... true James Bond style". The sound effect was described as "simply crass", with one writer, Jim Smith, suggesting that the stunt "brings into focus the lack of excitement in the rest of the film and is spoilt by the use of 'comedy' sound effects." Eon Productions had licensed the stunt, which had been designed by Raymond McHenry; the stunt was initially conceived at Cornell Aeronautical Laboratory (CAL) in Buffalo, New York as a test for their powerful vehicle simulation software. After development in simulation, ramps were built and the stunt was tested at CAL's proving ground. It toured as part of the All American Thrill Show as the Astro Spiral before it was picked up for the film. The British show Top Gear attempted to repeat the stunt in June 2008, but failed. The scene where Scaramanga's car flies was done at Bovington Camp, with a model inspired by an actual car plane prototype. Bond's duel with Scaramanga, which Mankewicz said was inspired by the climactic faceoff in Shane, had its length shortened as the producers felt it was causing pacing problems. The trailers featured some of the cut scenes.

Hamilton adapted an idea of his involving Bond in Disneyland for Scaramanga's funhouse. The funhouse was designed to be a place where Scaramanga could get the upper hand by distracting the adversary with obstacles, and was described by Murton as a "melting pot of ideas" which made it be "both a funhouse and a horror house". While an actual wax figure of Roger Moore was used, Moore's stunt double Les Crawford was the cowboy figure, and Ray Marione played the Al Capone figure. The canted sets such as the funhouse and the Queen Elizabeth had inspiration on German Expressionism films such as The Cabinet of Dr. Caligari. For Scaramanga's solar power plant, Hamilton used both the Pinewood set and a miniature projected by Derek Meddings, often cutting between each other to show there was no discernible difference. The destruction of the facility was a combination of practical effects on the set and a destruction of the miniature. Meddings based the island blowing up on footage of the Battle of Monte Cassino.

The Spy Who Loved Me
The film was shot at the Pinewood Studios in London, Porto Cervo in Sardinia (Hotel Cala di Volpe), Egypt (Karnak, Mosque of Ibn Tulun, Gayer-Anderson Museum, Abu Simbel temples), Malta, Scotland, Hayling Island UK, Okinawa, Switzerland and Mount Asgard on Baffin Island in the then northern Canadian territory of Northwest Territories (now located in Nunavut).

As no studio was big enough for the interior of Stromberg's supertanker, and set designer Ken Adam did not want to repeat what he had done with SPECTRE's volcano base in You Only Live Twice – "a workable but ultimately wasteful set" – in March 1976, construction began of a new sound stage at Pinewood, the 007 Stage, at the cost of $1.8 million. To complement this stage, Eon also paid for building a water tank capable of storing approximately 1,200,000 gallons (4,500,000 litres). The soundstage was in fact so enormous that celebrated director Stanley Kubrick visited the production, in secret, to advise on how to light the stage. For the exterior, while Shell was willing to lend an abandoned tanker to the production, the elevated insurance and safety risks caused it to be replaced with miniatures built by Derek Meddings' team and shot at the Bahamas. Stromberg's shark tank was also filmed in the Bahamas, using a live shark in a saltwater swimming pool. Adam decided to do experiments with curved shapes for the scenery, as he felt all his previous setpieces were "too linear". This was demonstrated with the Atlantis, which is a dome and curved surfaces outside, and many curved objects in Stromberg's office inside. For Gogol's offices, Adam wanted an open space to contrast M's enclosed headquarters, and drew inspiration from Sergei Eisenstein to do a "Russian crypt-like" set.

The main unit began its work in August 1976 in Sardinia. Don McLaughlan, then head of public relations at Lotus Cars, heard that Eon were shopping for a new Bond car. He drove a prototype Lotus Esprit with all Lotus branding taped over, and parked it outside the Eon offices at Pinewood studios; on seeing the car Eon asked Lotus to borrow both of the prototypes for filming. Initial filming of the car chase sequence resulted in disappointing action sequences. While moving the car between shoots, Lotus employee Roger Becker impressed with his handling of the car and for the rest of filming on Sardinia, Becker became the stunt driver.

In October, the second unit travelled to Nassau to film the underwater sequences. To perform the car becoming a submarine, seven different models were used, one for each step of the transformation. One of the models was a fully mobile submarine equipped with an engine built by Miami-based Perry Submarines. During the model sequences, the air bubbles seen appearing from the vehicle were created by Alka-Seltzer tablets. The car seen entering the sea was a mock-up shell, propelled off the jetty by a compressed air cannon.

In September, production moved to Egypt. While the Great Sphinx of Giza was shot on the location, lighting problems caused the pyramids to be replaced with miniatures. While construction of the Liparus set continued, the second unit headed by John Glen departed for Mount Asgard where in July 1976 they staged the film's pre-credits sequence. Bond film veteran Willy Bogner captured the action staged by stuntman Rick Sylvester who earned $30,000 for the stunt. This stunt cost $500,000 – the most expensive single movie stunt at that time.

The production team returned briefly to the UK to shoot at the Faslane submarine base before setting off to Spain, Portugal and the Bay of Biscay where the supertanker exteriors were filmed. On 5 December 1976, with principal photography finished, the 007 Stage was formally opened by the former Prime Minister Harold Wilson.

Moonraker
Production began on 14 August 1978. The main shooting was switched from the usual 007 Stage at the Pinewood Studios to France, due to high taxation in England at the time. Only the cable car interiors and space battle exteriors were filmed at Pinewood. The massive sets designed by Ken Adam were the largest ever constructed in France and required more than 222,000 man-hours to construct (roughly 1000 hours by each of the crew on average). They were shot at three of France's largest film studios in Épinay and Boulogne-Billancourt.

220 technicians used 100 tonnes of metal, two tonnes of nails and 10,000 feet of wood to build the three-story space station set at Eponay Studios. The elaborate space set for Moonraker holds the world record for having the largest number of zero gravity wires in one scene. The Venetian glass museum and fight between Bond and Chang was shot at Boulogne Studios in a building which had once been a World War II Luftwaffe aircraft factory during Germany's occupation of France. The scene in the Venice glass museum and warehouse holds the record for the largest amount of break-away sugar glass used in a single scene.

The remaining interiors, including some of the scenes with Corinne Defour and the drawing room, were filmed at the Château de Guermantes.

Much of the film was shot in the cities of London, Paris, Venice, Palmdale, California, Port St. Lucie, Florida, and Rio de Janeiro. The production team had considered India and Nepal as a location in the film but on arriving at those places to investigate, they found that it was inconceivable to write them into the script, particularly with time restrictions to do so. They decided on Rio de Janeiro, Brazil, relatively early on, a city that Cubby Broccoli had visited on vacation, and a team was sent to that city in early 1978 to capture initial footage from the Carnaval festival, which featured in the film.

At the Rio de Janeiro location, many months later, Roger Moore arrived several days later than scheduled for shooting due to recurrent health problems and an attack of kidney stones that he had suffered while in France. After arriving in Rio de Janeiro, Moore was immediately whisked off the plane and went straight to hair and make-up work, before re-boarding the plane, to film the sequence with him arriving as James Bond in the film. Sugarloaf Mountain was a prominent location in the film, and during filming of the cable car sequence in which Bond and Goodhead are attacked by Jaws during mid-air transportation high above Rio de Janeiro, the stuntman Richard Graydon slipped and narrowly avoided falling to his death. For the scene in which Jaws bites into the steel tramway cable with his teeth, the cable was actually made of liquorice, although Richard Kiel was still required to use his steel dentures.

Iguazu Falls was a natural location depicted in the film, although as stated by "Q" in the film, the falls were intended to be located somewhere in the upper basin of the Amazon River rather than where the falls are actually located in the south of Brazil. The second unit had originally planned on sending an actual boat over the falls. However, on attempting to release it, the boat became firmly embedded on rocks near the edge. Despite a dangerous attempt by helicopter and rope ladder to retrieve it, the plan had to be abandoned, forcing the second unit to use a miniature at Pinewood instead. The exterior of Drax's pyramid headquarters in the Amazon rain forest near the falls was actually filmed at the Tikal Mayan ruins in Guatemala. The interior of the pyramid, however, was designed by Ken Adam at a French studio, in which he purposefully used a shiny coating to make the walls look plastic and false. All of the space centre scenes were shot at the Vehicle Assembly Building of the Kennedy Space Center, Florida, although some of the earlier scenes of the Moonraker assembly plant had been filmed on location at the Rockwell International manufacturing plant in Palmdale, California.

The early scene involving Bond and Jaws in which Bond is pushed out of the aircraft without a parachute took weeks of planning and preparation. The skydiving sequence was coordinated by Don Calvedt under the supervision of second unit director John Glen. As Calvedt and skydiving champion B.J. Worth developed the equipment for the scene, which included a  parachute pack that could be concealed beneath the suit to give the impression of the missing parachute, and an equipment to prevent the freefalling cameraman from suffering whiplash while opening his parachute, they brought in stuntman Jake Lombard to test it all. Lombard eventually played Bond in the scene, with Worth as the pilot from which Bond takes a parachute, and Ron Luginbill as Jaws. Both Lombard and Worth would become regular member of the stunt team for aerial sequences in later Bond films. When the stunt men opened their parachutes at the end of every shoot, custom-sewn velcro costume seams would separate to allow the hidden parachutes to open. The skydiver cinematographer used a lightweight Panavision camera, bought from an old pawn shop in Paris, which he had adapted, and attached to his helmet to shoot the entire sequence. The scene took a total of 88 skydives by the stuntmen to be completed. The only scenes shot in studio were close-ups of Roger Moore and Richard Kiel.

Since NASA's Space Shuttle program had not been launched, Derek Meddings and his miniatures team had to create the rocket launch footage without any reference. Shuttle models attached to bottle rockets and signal flares were used for takeoff, and the smoke trail was created with salt that fell from the models. The space scenes were done by rewinding the camera after an element was shot, enabling other elements to be superimposed in the film stock, with the space battle needing up to forty rewinds to incorporate everything.

For the scene involving the opening of the musical electronic laboratory door lock in Venice, producer Albert R. Broccoli requested special permission from director Steven Spielberg to use the five-note melody from his film Close Encounters of the Third Kind (1977). In 1985, Broccoli would return the favour by fulfilling Spielberg's request to use the James Bond theme music for a scene in his film, The Goonies (1985).

Critical response

References

James Bond in film
1970s in film
Bond